Nonlinearity is a peer-reviewed scientific journal published by IOP Publishing and the London Mathematical Society. The journal publishes papers on nonlinear mathematics, mathematical physics, experimental physics, theoretical physics and other areas in the sciences where nonlinear phenomena are of fundamental importance. The Editors-in-Chief are Tasso J Kaper (Boston University) for IOP Publishing and Konstantin Khanin (University of Toronto) for the London Mathematical Society.

Abstracting and indexing 
The journal is abstracted and indexed in Science Citation Index, Current Contents/Physical, Chemical & Earth Sciences, Inspec, CompuMath Citation Index, Mathematical Reviews, MathSciNet, Zentralblatt MATH, and VINITI Database RAS. According to the Journal Citation Reports, the journal has a 2020 impact factor of 2.129.

See also
 Journal of Physics A
 Inverse Problems
London Mathematical Society 
IOP Publishing

References

External links
 

Physics journals
IOP Publishing academic journals
Publications established in 1988
Mathematics journals
Monthly journals
English-language journals
London Mathematical Society